Gdynia Główna railway station (Polish for Gdynia main station) is the main railway station serving the city of Gdynia, in the Pomeranian Voivodeship, Poland. The station opened in 1921 and is located on the Nowa Wieś Wielka–Gdynia Port railway, Gdańsk–Stargard railway and the parallel Gdańsk Śródmieście–Rumia railway. Trains are operated by PKP, Polregio and SKM Tricity.

History
The first railway station in the centre of Gdynia opened on 1 January 1894. Initially, it held only a small wooden waiting room, several lamps and a board identifying name of the stop. In 1920, Gdynia began to grow very quickly as a city and a port under the Second Polish Republic, and this resulted in a significant increase in passenger rail traffic. Therefore, between 1923 and 1926, a new imposing art-deco (with regional Pomeranian accents) main building was constructed, designed by Romuald Miller and opening on 15 July 1926. Its interior featured a large waiting room, ticket windows, toilets, luggage storage, a restaurant, bookstore, money exchange, and hairdresser.

The railway station building was destroyed in World War II. In the 1950s a new station was built, designed by prof. Waclaw Tomaszewski. The building is a unique combination of social realism and pre-war art-moderne modernism. In the station's main waiting room several notable wall and ceiling frescoes of sea landscapes were re-discovered during the 2008 renovation after having been covered over in the intervening years. In the dining hall, the wall paintings depict the celestial bodies and signs of the zodiac, and a mosaic illustrates Pegasus.

The station under Nazi German occupation was known as Gotenhafen. Until 11 March 2004, the station was officially called Gdynia Osobowa. Currently, all the markings changed to "Gdynia Glowna". Among others, a large inscription "Osobowa" on the station building was dismantled.

Modernisation
In August 2008, the station building was entered in the register of monuments. In the same year, a modernisation program of the station was initiated, which included reconstruction of the station concourse, new canopies on the platforms, and changes in the rail traffic control system. During this work, in 2011, an original 5-meter long brick wall from the 1926 station was discovered. It has been preserved and integrated into the newly renovated interior. On 6 June 2012 the modernised station was officially opened. The investment cost 40.7 million euro and was financed in part with EU funds.

Train services

The station is served by the following services:

EuroCity services (EC) (EC 95 by DB) (IC by PKP) Gdynia - Gdansk - Bydgoszcz - Poznan - Rzepin - Frankfurt (Oder) - Berlin
EuroCity services (EC) Gdynia - Gdansk - Malbork - Warsaw - Katowice - Bohumin - Ostrava - Prerov - Breclav - Vienna
Express Intercity Premium services (EIP) Gdynia - Warsaw
Express Intercity Premium services (EIP) Gdynia - Warsaw - Katowice - Gliwice/Bielsko-Biała
Express Intercity Premium services (EIP) Gdynia/Kołobrzeg - Warsaw - Kraków (- Rzeszów)
Intercity services (IC) Gdynia - Gdansk - Bydgoszcz - Poznań - Wrocław - Opole - Katowice - Kraków - Rzeszów - Przemyśl
Intercity services (IC) Gdynia - Gdańsk - Bydgoszcz - Toruń - Kutno - Łódź - Częstochowa - Katowice - Bielsko-Biała
Intercity services (IC) Gdynia - Gdańsk - Bydgoszcz - Łódź - Czestochowa — Krakow — Zakopane
Intercity services (IC) Gdynia - Gdańsk - Bydgoszcz - Poznań - Zielona Góra
Intercity services (IC) Gdynia - Gdańsk - Bydgoszcz - Poznań - Wrocław 
 Intercity services (IC) Łódź Fabryczna — Warszawa — Gdańsk Glowny — Kołobrzeg
Intercity services (IC) Szczecin - Koszalin - Słupsk - Gdynia - Gdańsk
Intercity services (IC) Szczecin - Koszalin - Słupsk - Gdynia - Gdańsk - Elbląg/Iława - Olsztyn
Intercity services (IC) Szczecin - Koszalin - Słupsk - Gdynia - Gdańsk - Elbląg - Olsztyn - Białystok
Intercity services (TLK) Gdynia Główna — Kostrzyn 
Intercity services (TLK) Gdynia Główna — Warszawa — Krakow — Zakopane 
Intercity services (TLK) Kołobrzeg — Gdynia Główna — Warszawa Wschodnia — Kraków Główny
Regional services (R) Tczew — Gdynia Chylonia 
Regional services (R) Tczew — Słupsk  
Regional services (R) Malbork — Słupsk  
Regional services (R) Malbork — Gdynia Chylonia 
Regional services (R) Elbląg — Gdynia Chylonia 
Regional services (R) Elbląg — Słupsk  
Regional services (R) Chojnice — Tczew — Gdynia Główna 
Regional services (R) Gdynia Chylonia — Olsztyn Główny
Regional services (R) Gdynia Chylonia — Smętowo 
Regional services (R) Gdynia Chylonia — Laskowice Pomorskie 
Regional services (R) Gdynia Chylonia — Bydgoszcz Główna 
Regional services (R) Słupsk — Bydgoszcz Główna 
Regional services (R) Gdynia Chylonia — Pruszcz Gdański 
Regional services (R) Hel - Władysławowo - Reda - Gdynia Główna
Regional services (R) Luzino — Gdynia Główna
Regional services (R) Słupsk — Gdynia Główna
Pomorska Kolej Metropolitalna services (R) Gdynia Główna — Gdańsk Osowa — Gdańsk Port Lotniczy (Airport) — Gdańsk Wrzeszcz
Pomorska Kolej Metropolitalna services (R) Kościerzyna — Gdańsk Osowa — Gdynia Główna 
Pomorska Kolej Metropolitalna services (R) Kościerzyna — Gdańsk Port Lotniczy (Airport) — Gdańsk Wrzeszcz — Gdynia Główna
Szybka Kolej Miejska services (SKM) (Lębork -) Wejherowo - Reda - Rumia - Gdynia - Sopot - Gdansk

References

External links

Photos of Gdynia Głowna

Railway stations served by Szybka Kolej Miejska (Tricity)
Glowna
Railway stations served by Przewozy Regionalne InterRegio
Railway stations in Poland opened in 1894